Axintele is a commune located in Ialomița County, Muntenia, Romania. It is composed of three villages: Axintele, Bărbătescu and Horia.

Natives
George Acsinteanu

References

Communes in Ialomița County
Localities in Muntenia